A White Man's Chance is a 1919 American silent adventure film directed by Ernest C. Warde and starring J. Warren Kerrigan, Lillian Walker and Joseph J. Dowling.

Synopsis
A Boston lawyer heads to Mexico for work and soon becomes embroiled in trouble.

Cast
 J. Warren Kerrigan as Donald Joseph Blenhorn
 Lillian Walker as Dorothy Charlton
 Joseph J. Dowling as William Roberts
 Howard Davies as Hugh Hankins
 Andrew Arbuckle as Valentino
 Joseph Hazelton as Pedro
 George Field as Juan Lopez
 Joe Ray as Augustin Gonzalez 
 Dick La Reno as The Magistrado

References

Bibliography
 Goble, Alan. The Complete Index to Literary Sources in Film. Walter de Gruyter, 1999.

External links
 

1919 films
1919 drama films
1910s English-language films
American silent feature films
Silent American drama films
American black-and-white films
Films directed by Ernest C. Warde
Films distributed by W. W. Hodkinson Corporation
Pathé Exchange films
Films based on works by Johnston McCulley
1910s American films